Maxim Petrovich Konchalovsky (born 1 (13) October 1875, Odessa - November 29, 1942, Moscow) was a Russian and Soviet doctor, close clinician, founder of the school of internal medicine clinic.

The elder brother of the artist Pyotr Konchalovsky.

References

External links
 Моя жизнь, встречи и впечатления

1875 births
1942 deaths
Burials at Novodevichy Cemetery
19th-century physicians from the Russian Empire
Soviet physicians